is a Japanese pop duo from Yomitan, Okinawa that debuted in 1996.

History
Kiroro debuted in 1996 as an independent band, and later made their major debut in 1998 with the song "". They performed on Kōhaku Uta Gassen in 1998, 1999 and 2001.

Etymology 

When vocalist Chiharu Tamashiro was in her primary school days, she visited Ikedamachi, Hokkaido, for a regional exchange program. The Ainu language made a deep impression on her. With the Ainu words 'Kiroru' and 'Kiroro-an', Tamashiro and Kinjo decided on the name "Kiroro" for the group; "Kiroru" meaning a wide walking path and "Kiroro-an" meaning "resilient" and "healthy."

The name "Kiroro," however, was already registered in 1981 to the Yamaha Organization in Hamamatsu City, Shizuoka, for the Kiroro Resort in Akaigawa Village, Hokkaido. Victor Entertainment made agreements with the Yamaha organization for use of the name.

Members
  (born  in Okinawa, Japan) - chorus and vocals
  (born  in Okinawa, Japan) - keyboard

Discography

Albums
  - October 1, 1998
 Nagai Aida
 
 Mirai e
 
 
 
 
 
 
 
  - September 22, 1999 (Ayano Kinjo's solo album)
  - December 8, 1999
  - September 26, 2000 (Concept Album)
 TREE OF LIFE - January 13, 2001 (Taiwan), January 24, 2001 (Japan) (It is the first time (and only time, up to the album Wonderful Days) that the date of release in Taiwan is earlier than Japan.)
  - February 21, 2002 (Best Album)
 Four Leaves Clover - December 18, 2002
 Diary - March 3, 2004
  - January 21, 2005 (Okinawa limited edition), June 23, 2005 (National edition) (Mini album) (Dedicated to their homeland, Okinawa. The 'national level' edition also contains an introductory flash clip that describes the places of interest in Okinawa. 
 Wonderful Days - November 23, 2005
  - March 29, 2006 (Best album by fan votes)
  - March 7, 2007 (Played by Ayano, a lullaby album for babies)
  - March 7, 2007 (A collector's edition)
  - March 29, 2016 (Concept Best Album)
  - January 24, 2018

Singles

  - January 21, 1998
 Nagai Aida
 
 Nagai Aida (Original Karaoke)
 Sannin no Shashin (Original Karaoke)
  - June 24, 1998
 Mirai e
 
 Mirai e (Original Karaoke)
 Tenki ga Ii Asa (Original Karaoke)
  - November 21, 1998
 Fuyu no Uta
 
 Fuyu no Uta (Original Karaoke)
 Kiseki (Original Karaoke)
  - February 24, 1999
 Ao no Jumon
 
 Ao no Jumon (Original Karaoke)
 Haru no Kaze (Original Karaoke)
  - June 23, 1999
 Saigo no Kiss
 
 Saigo no Kiss (Original Karaoke)
 Chokin (Original Karaoke)
  - November 10, 1999
 Suki na Hito
 
 Suki na Hito (Original Karaoke)
 Chance (Original Karaoke)
  - March 23, 2000
 Himawari
 
 Himawari (Original Karaoke)
 Nawatobi (Original Karaoke)
  - July 26, 2000
 Namida ni Sayonara
 Blue Sky
 Namida ni Sayonara (Original Karaoke)
 Blue Sky (Original Karaoke)
  - December 6, 2000
 Aitai
 
 Aitai (Backing Track)
 Yoru o Miagete (Backing Track)
 Best Friend - June 6, 2001
 Best Friend
 again
 Best Friend (Backing Track)
 again (Backing Track)
  - August 21, 2002
 Aisanai
 
 
  - December 4, 2002
 Hitotsubu no Namida
 
  - November 21, 2003
 Bokura no Messēji
 
 
  - January 21, 2004
 Mou Sukoshi
 
  - July 6, 2005 (Mushiking anime opening theme song)
 Ikitekoso
 
 
  - October 21, 2005 (with special edition)
 Wasurenai de ~Live at Okinawa '05~
 Beginning
  - December 3, 2008
  - March 4, 2009 (Anime movie Chō Gekijōban Keroro Gunsō: Gekishin Dragon Warriors theme song)

 Note: All singles from Nagai Aida up to Suki na Hito were released again on February 21, 2002.

Personal life 
In January 2005, vocalist Chiharu Tamashiro announced that she was engaged. On April 17 (which coincided with her birthday), she and her fiancé entered the family registry. In May, pianist Ayano Kinjo announced her pregnancy and marriage. In July, Tamashiro announced her pregnancy. In September 2005, they held their "four person concert" in Okinawa with the finale, Wasurenaide ("Don't Forget") before their maternal leave. Kinjo gave birth to a daughter in November 2005. Tamashiro gave birth to a son in February 2006. In March 2007, Tamashiro announced her second pregnancy, and in September 2007, she gave birth to a daughter. In August 2008, Kinjo announced her second pregnancy, and she gave birth to a son in March 2009. Also in March 2009, Tamashiro announced her third pregnancy, and she gave birth to another daughter in September 2009. In October 2010, Kinjo announced her third pregnancy, and she gave birth to another son in March 2011. In April 2013, Kinjo divorced her husband.

References 
 The Libertytimes Web
 http://ent.sina.com.cn/2003年04月10日12:23 南方都市报
 https://web.archive.org/web/20070818095341/http://www.okinawatimes.co.jp/eng/19980919.html The Okinawa Times. September 9, 1998.
 http://tw2.yahoo.com/profile/285

External links
 Official website (multi language)

Japanese pop music groups
Musical groups from Okinawa Prefecture